Shiloh Township is a township in Neosho County, Kansas, in the United States.

Shiloh Township was organized in 1870.

References

Townships in Neosho County, Kansas
Townships in Kansas